Route 92 or  is a national road in the Eastern Region of Iceland. It connects the towns of Reyðarfjörður, Eskifjörður, and Neskaupstaður (all of them are in the municipality of Fjarðabyggð) and includes the tunnel Norðfjarðargöng which opened to traffic on 11 November 2017. Until the opening of Norðfjarðargöng, the road used the shorter tunnel Oddsskarðsgöng which was located at a higher elevation at the Oddsskarð pass and was often closed in winter.

Also until 11 November 2017, Route 92 continued from Reyðarfjörður to Egilsstaðir. That part of the road is now numbered as part of the Ring Road (Route 1), together with former Route 96.

References

Roads in Iceland